The United States Post Office and Court House in Huntington, West Virginia is a federal building housing the United States District Court for the Southern District of West Virginia. It was built in 1907 and expanded in 1907, and again in 1937. The original construction was the result of the Tarsney Act of 1893. The federal courthouse is part of a group of significant civic structures in the center of Huntington that includes the Cabell County Courthouse, the Huntington City Hall and the Carnegie Public Library. The original design was by Parker and Thomas of Boston and Baltimore. The post office has since been moved to another location. In 1980, the United States Congress passed legislation renaming the building the Sidney L. Christie Federal Building, in honor of District Court judge Sidney Lee Christie.

See also 
List of United States post offices

References

External links 

Historic Federal Courthouses page from the Federal Judicial Center.

Federal buildings in the United States
Beaux-Arts architecture in West Virginia
Government buildings completed in 1907
Buildings and structures in Huntington, West Virginia
Courthouses in West Virginia
Federal courthouses in the United States
Post office buildings on the National Register of Historic Places in West Virginia
National Register of Historic Places in Cabell County, West Virginia
Individually listed contributing properties to historic districts on the National Register in West Virginia